Pertevniyal High School of Istanbul was founded in 1872 by Pertevniyal Sultan, the mother of Sultan Abdulaziz. It cost 3520 gold coins to build the school. The school was forced to relocate after the fire of 1911, which destroyed much of downtown Istanbul. A new building was not constructed until 1968. In 1992 it became an Anatolian High School.

The school campus is located in the center of Istanbul. The school consists of 3 buildings. One is the main administrative building, called building A. This includes administrative units, classrooms, a meeting room and a library. Building A is the oldest building in the school which was built in the 19th century. Building B has classrooms and computer labs. In building C are more classrooms, a gymnasium, labs and a conference hall that can hold 300 people. It's one of the oldest and prominent high schools in Istanbul.

High schools in Istanbul
1872 establishments in the Ottoman Empire
Educational institutions established in 1872
Fatih